StormRider was a simulator ride at Tokyo DisneySea. It simulated going into a weather storm in a futuristic aircraft (a "StormRider") to dissipate the storm. The attraction opened on September 4, 2001, in the Port Discovery land of Tokyo DisneySea. The attraction closed on May 17, 2016, and replaced by a new Finding Nemo/Finding Dory simulator ride called Nemo & Friends SeaRider.

Ride 
With its copper roofs and mechanical devices, the attraction building—the "Center for Weather Control"—was themed to a scientific laboratory, and perfectly fitted in with the rest of Port Discovery's architecture. After entering the show building, guests enter a pre-show room where a gigantic radar is displayed as well as a model of a strange device. A scientist climbed on a podium and explained the mission, that there is a big storm  approaching Port Discovery and guests are to deploy a "Fuse" (a storm-dissipating device) into the eye of the storm in a StormRider (a flying laboratory). 

After a brief demonstration of the fuse (the device displayed), riders are dispatched into the hangar that houses the StormRider vehicles. 
Guests board one of the two flying labs docked there. When the protective windshield cover is opened, guests can see that their vehicle is now hovering outside the hangar, awaiting clearance to take off. As they wait, guests are treated to a spectacular view of the waters of Port Discovery and the ocean beyond. They can see that the other vehicle is hovering ahead. Clearance is given and the flight is underway. The sensation of take-off is exciting, accentuated by the view out the windshield as Hydra 7, a floating city quickly disappears beneath the vehicle.

Nearing the huge, dark storm, it is clear to see that this is not just any average weather disturbance — this is the storm of the century, the greatest challenge for the StormRider pilots, and possibly, the most deadly. Suddenly a lightning strike renders the other StormRider incapable of completing the mission and it must return to base. Although the StormRider with the guests aboard is ordered to return as well, Captain Davis, the vehicles pilot, feeling that he is within striking distance of the storm, ignores the order and continues on. But the Fuse doesn't operate as expected and punctures into the ship. After detonating the storm, the real thrill of StormRider begins with a while-knuckle race against time to make it back safely to Port Discovery. 

In the end, the Stormrider manages to make a splash landing, but as soon as it stabilizes, the windshield closes, indicating the end of the ride. Then, the guests exit outside the cabin and walk outside, ready to explore the rest of what Port Discovery had to offer.

See also 
 List of Tokyo DisneySea attractions

References 

Simulator rides
Tokyo DisneySea
Port Discovery (Tokyo DisneySea)
Audio-Animatronic attractions
Walt Disney Parks and Resorts attractions
2001 establishments in Japan
2016 disestablishments in Japan